Lyle "Rusty" Dedrick (12 July 1918 – 25 December 2009) was an American swing and bebop jazz trumpeter and composer born in Delevan, New York, probably better known for his work with Bill Borden, Dick Stabile, Red Norvo, Ray McKinley and Claude Thornhill, among others.

In 1971, Dedrick joined the faculty of the Manhattan College of Music, later becoming director of jazz studies.

He was the uncle of the members of the sunshine pop group The Free Design.

Discography

As leader/co-leader
Counterpoint for Six Valves (Riverside, 1955–56) - with Don Elliott
Salute to Bunny (Counterpoint, 1957)
Twelve Isham Jones Evergreens (Monmouth, 1964)

As sideman
With Bobby Hackett
Creole Cookin' (Verve, 1967)
With Maxine Sullivan
Sullivan Shakespeare Hyman (Audiophile, 1971)

References

External links

Rusty Dedrick's personal site
Lyle "Rusty" Dedrick obituary, December 31, 2009

1918 births
2009 deaths
American jazz trumpeters
American male trumpeters
Bebop trumpeters
Swing trumpeters
20th-century American musicians
20th-century trumpeters
20th-century American male musicians
American male jazz musicians